Glorious Days (lit. Free) is a 2019 Indonesian buddy comedy drama film directed by Riri Riza. The film is an Indonesian-language remake of the 2011 South Korean film Sunny.

The film tells the story about Vina, a middle-aged woman who tries to fulfill her friend, Kris' wish of reuniting their high school clique. It alternates between two timelines: the present day and the 1990s when they were in high school.

Premise
Kris, who is diagnosed with terminal cancer with two months left to live, wishes to reunite her high school clique, Geng Bebas, with the help of Vina, a fellow member.

Cast

Release
Glorious Days was released theatrically in Indonesia on 3 October 2019. The film garnered 161,104 moviegoers in its opening weekend, finishing second in the national box office. By the end of its run, the film garnered a total of 513,521 moviegoers and grossed Rp 20.5 billion ($1,436,010). Catchplay+ acquired the distribution rights to the film, releasing it on 2 February 2020. The film was also distributed through Netflix on 10 March 2022.

Accolades

References

External links
 

Indonesian comedy-drama films
2010s buddy comedy-drama films
Indonesian teen films
Films set in the 1990s
Films about cancer
Films about death
Films about friendship
Films directed by Riri Riza
CJ Entertainment films
2019 comedy films
2019 drama films